Rebecca Frankel is an American author. She is the former executive editor of Foreign Policy.

Books
Into the Forest: A Holocaust Story of Survival, Triumph, and Love (St. Martin's Press, 2021)
War Dogs: Tales of Canine Heroism, History, and Love (St. Martin's Press, 2014)

References

External links
Official website

American writers
American women writers
Living people
Year of birth missing (living people)
21st-century American women